U.C. Sampdoria won their first ever European trophy, thanks to a Cup Winners' Cup final victory against Anderlecht, thanks to two extra time goals from star striker Gianluca Vialli.

Squad

Goalkeepers
  Gianluca Pagliuca
  Giulio Nuciari
  Fabrizio Casazza

Defenders
  Moreno Mannini
  Pietro Vierchowod
  Marco Lanna
  Amedeo Carboni
  Luca Pellegrini
  Patrick Moro
  Fausto Pari

Midfielders
  Giovanni Invernizzi
  Attilio Lombardo
  Srečko Katanec
  Fausto Salsano
  Giuseppe Dossena
  Roberto Breda
  Toninho Cerezo
  Víctor Muñoz

Attackers
  Roberto Mancini
  Gianluca Vialli
  Enrico Chiesa

Competitions

Serie A

League table

Matches

Top Scorers
  Roberto Mancini 11
  Gianluca Vialli 10
  Attilio Lombardo 6
  Srečko Katanec 4

Coppa Italia

First round 

Second round

Group phase

Group 4

European Cup Winners' Cup

First round

Eightfinals

Quarterfinals

Semifinals

Final

Supercoppa

References

Sources
  RSSSF - Italy 1989/90

U.C. Sampdoria seasons
Sampdoria
UEFA Cup Winners' Cup-winning seasons